The Qiding Tunnels are two former railway tunnels in Zhunan Township, Miaoli County, Taiwan.

History
The two tunnels were built during the Japanese rule of Taiwan. During the World War II, one of the tunnel wall was damaged by bomb. In 2005, the tunnels were listed as historical site.

Architecture
The tunnels were built with red brick for their interior walls. There are also many walls found inside one of the tunnel caused by gun fight before.

Transportation
The tunnels are accessible within walking distance northeast of Qiding Station of Taiwan Railways.

See also
 List of tourist attractions in Taiwan

References

Buildings and structures in Miaoli County
Railway tunnels in Taiwan
Tourist attractions in Miaoli County